Bellatrix Female Warriors, also known as Bellatrix, is a British independent women's professional wrestling promotion based in Norwich. The company was founded by Sweet Saraya in 2006 as the World Association of Women's Wrestling, a sister company to her husband Ricky Knight's World Association of Wrestling. The promotion tours theatres, leisure centres, and town halls.

History
The company was founded by Sweet Saraya in 2005 as the World Association of Women's Wrestling, a sister company to her husband Ricky Knight's World Association of Wrestling. The name was later changed to Bellatrix Female Warriors, as bellatrix is Latin for "female warrior". The company trains their own wrestlers, as well as hosts international talent. Trainees are taught traditional British catch wrestling. In addition, shows are promoted via video on demand or internet pay-per-view (iPPV).

Bellatrix has working agreements with Real Quality Wrestling, Shimmer Women Athletes, IndyGurlz Australia, and LDN Wrestling. The promotions cross-promote shows and championships.

Championships

Current

Queen of the Ring Tournament

Bellatrix World Championship

Names

Reigns

Combined reigns

Bellatrix European Championship

Names

Reigns

Combined reigns

Bellatrix British Championship

Names

Reigns

Combined reigns

Bellatrix Academy Championship

Reigns

Combined reigns

Roster

Main Roster

Amarah
Angel
Connie Steele
Destiny
Dominita
Erin Angel
Karama
Lady Bella van der Velt
Leia Elise
Lily Fae
Maddison Miles
Queen Maya
Saraya Knight
Steffi Sky
Trai-cie
Vanessa
Violet O'Hara

Academy

Annabelle
Fifi
Fiona
Freyja Nyx
Jolene
Lilith
Princess
TJ
Tuka

Alumni

Addy Starr
Alex Windsor
'Amazon' Ayesha Ray
Amy Lee Kramer
April Davids
Ashley Paige
Bengal Tiger
Blue Nikita
Britani Knight
Courtney Rush
Dahlia Black
Dragonita
Em Jay
Emi Sakura
Emma Ford
Fiona Fraser
Hannah Blossom
Hikari Minami
Hikaru Shida
Holly Blossom
James Scott
Janey B
Jemma Palmer
Jenny Sjödin
Jetta
Jinny
Kaori Yoneyama
Kasey Owens
Kat Waters
Kay Lee Ray
Kirsty Love
Laura Di Matteo
Leigh Owens
Leon Britannico
Mark Anthony
Manami Toyota
Meiko Satomura
Melanie Price
Mercedes Martinez
Melodi
Mickie James
Miss Mina
Nixon Newell
Penelope
Psycho Lolita
Rhia O'Reilly
Sammi Hope
Sammii Jayne
Santarea
Sara Marie-Taylor
Shanna
Tennessee Honey
Toni Storm
Tsukasa Fujimoto
Viper
Vix
Zoe Lucas

References

External links

British professional wrestling promotions
Women's professional wrestling promotions
British companies established in 2005